Șepreuș is a commune in Arad County, Romania, is situated on the northern part of the Teuz Plateau, it stretches over 5768 ha. It is composed of a single village, Șepreuș, situated at 63 km from Arad.

Population
According to the last census, the population of the commune counts 2472 inhabitants, out of which 89.6% are Romanians,
0.8% Hungarians, 9.3% Roma and 0.3% are of other or undeclared nationalities.

History
The first documentary record of the locality Șepreuș dates back to 1407.

Economy
The economy of the commune is based on agriculture, mainly on growing of grain, maize, sunflower, barley, sugar-beet,
vegetable, oil plants, fodder-crop and technical crops.

Tourism
Șepreuș is known for its fishponds and its castle built in the 19th century.

References

Communes in Arad County
Localities in Crișana